The Procurement G6 is an informal group of six national central purchasing bodies. It is also known as the Multilateral Meeting on Government Procurement (MMGP).

Members 
Members of the Procurement G6 are: 
 : Public Services and Procurement Canada
 : ChileCompra
 : Consip
 : Public Procurement Service
 : Crown Commercial Service
 : General Services Administration

Scope 
Each country shares experiences about: 
 e–procurement systems
 challenges, opportunities and actions for small and medium enterprises (SME)
 their qualification systems for enterprises 
 instruments and indicators for the performance measuring of the Central Purchasing Bodies and their impact on the economic system, on the public sector and on the enterprises 
 actions to minimize the corruption risk 
 the green procurement scenarios

Past meetings of the Procurement G6 have included:
 June 15–16, 2009 — San Antonio, 
 June 10–12, 2010 – Rome, 
 September 24–26, 2013 — Seoul, 
 May 24–25, 2016 – Rome, 
 October 10–11, 2018 — Vancouver

See also 
 Agreement on Government Procurement
 Auction
 E–procurement
 Expediting
 Global sourcing
 Group purchasing organization
 Purchasing
 Strategic sourcing

Notes and references

External links 

 Consip  
 CC – Direcciòn ChileCompra 
 GSA – General Services Administration 
 OGC – Office of Government Commerce 
 PPS – Public Procurement Service 
 PWGSC – Public Works and Government Services Canada 

Systems engineering
Public eProcurement